Jenny Brown may refer to:

Jenny Brown (feminist), American author and radical feminist
Jenny Brown (Phineas and Ferb), a recurring character in the TV series
Jenny Brown Associates, a Scottish literary agency
Jenny Gilbertson (1902–1990), Scottish film-maker, born Jenny Brown
the unknown person named in Jenny Brown's Point, a headland in Silverdale, Lancashire, England

See also
Jennifer Brown (disambiguation)